EUE may refer to:

 Elliot Unger and Elliot, an American commercial production company
 EUE European Universities in Egypt, an international university institution in the New Administrative Capital of Egypt
 EUE Editions Universitaires Européennes, a German publishing company
 Eureka Airport (Nevada)
 Euskal Ezkerra, a political party in the Basque Country, Spain
 Exotic ungulate encephalopathy